Baratti may refer to:

Place
Baratti (town), town in Italy
Baratti and Populonia Archeological Park, Park in the province of Livorno in Italy

People
Antonio Baratti, (1724-1787), Italian engraver
Boris de Rachewiltz (redirect from Boris Baratti), Italian Egyptologist 
 Éva Barati (born 1968 in Üröm) is a Hungarian athlete

See also 
 Barati (disambiguation)